Balila (Arabic: بليلا) is a town in far northwest Jordan, between Irbid and Jerash located in the Jerash Governorate. It covers 40 km², and has a population of over 8,000.

Name
Balila is Turkish for "high point". It is located at the foot of the mountains bordering Syria known as Huran, which translates to "flat land".

History
Balila is located near the border of Syria and Occupied Palestine. The Roman Empire utilized Balila as a remote hub to link between their colonies.

In 1838  Balila was noted as being in ruins.

The Jordanian census of 1961 found 761 inhabitants in Balila.

Economy
Balila's economy relies on both public and private sectors, local commerce and farming.

Culture
Balila is a small quiet town in Jerash, the people there are famous because of their higher education levels. As other towns in Jordan around 40% of capital workers work in Jordan military and 40% in education jobs. Balila Consist of seven families all of them migrate from another town in Jerash called Migbelah, so people around Balila call the Magableh in connection to their original town. The Magableh family originated from the famous tribe Bani Tamim which had a great impact on the Arab world. These families are Bani-Mousa, Alokaili, Sowan, Okahsat, Masalha, Bani Yousef, Al-Gablan, Akawnah. All of them back to one grandfather.  the total population is about 7,000 people. In the days of Othman's Khilafat and until the mid-eighties of the 20th century, the people of Balila worked in their farms after that they start higher education evolution, as a result of that 65% of the population hold a university degree, and 85% of those born after 1980 hold the first degree, many of them holding also the second degree and the doctoral degree.

References

Bibliography

 

Municipalities in Jordan
Populated places in Jerash Governorate